Gerardo Cortes Jr. (born 18 February 1959) is a Chilean modern pentathlete. He competed at the 1988 Summer Olympics. His father, Gerardo Cortes Sr., competed in the pentathlon at the 1956 Summer Olympics.

References

External links
 

1959 births
Living people
Chilean male modern pentathletes
Olympic modern pentathletes of Chile
Modern pentathletes at the 1988 Summer Olympics